Parallactis ochrobyrsa is a moth in the family Autostichidae. It was described by Edward Meyrick in 1921. It is found in Zimbabwe.

The wingspan is about 17 mm. The forewings are yellow ochreous and the hindwings are grey.

References

Endemic fauna of Zimbabwe
Moths described in 1921
Parallactis
Taxa named by Edward Meyrick